Mezőcsát is a small town in Borsod-Abaúj-Zemplén county, Northern Hungary, 35 kilometers from county capital Miskolc.

History
The area has been inhabited since ancient times. In 1067 a monastery was founded here. At this time the village was called Csát and it had two separate parts: Szabadcsát, where freemen lived, and Lakcsát where serfs lived.

During the Mongol invasion of Hungary Mezőcsát was destroyed. It was mentioned again only in the 1330s. After the battle of Mezőkeresztes it was abandoned again, but people settled in the area once more when Borsod comitatus was ruled from Transylvania under Ruling Prince Gábor Bethlen. In 1686 the Imperial forces burnt Mezőcsát down, but in a document from 1698 it is mentioned as a town with right to hold a market, so it must have been a significant town then. The inhabitants took part in the revolution against the Habsburgs in 1848-49, and the imperial forces burnt the village again.

After 1867 Mezőcsát prospered, the railway line reached the village; mills were built and banks were opened.

In World War I, Mezőcsát lost 176 of its residents. The monument on Heroes Square, the main square of Mezőcsát, was erected to their memory. During World War II the Jewish inhabitants were deported. On 7 November 1944, the Soviet army occupied the village.

During the next few decades Mezőcsát prospered, even though its role as centre of the area was taken over by the newly built town of Tiszaújváros. On 1 January 1991, Mezőcsát regained its town status.

Tourist sights
 Manor of the Dobozy family

References

External links 

  in Hungarian

Populated places in Borsod-Abaúj-Zemplén County